Pterotopteryx colchica is a moth of the family Alucitidae. It was described by Zagulajev in 1992. It is found in Adjara.

References

Moths described in 1992
Alucitidae